14 teams participated in the 1991–92 Egyptian Premier League season. The first team in the league was the champion, and qualified to the African Cup of Champions Clubs.
Zamalek managed to win the league for the 7th time in the club's history.

League table

Relegation play-off

First Leg

Second Leg

Top goalscorers

References

1991–92 in African association football leagues
0
Premier